In enzymology, a N-acetylglucosaminyldiphosphoundecaprenol glucosyltransferase is an enzyme that catalyzes the chemical reaction

UDP-glucose + N-acetyl-D-glucosaminyldiphosphoundecaprenol  UDP + beta-D-glucosyl-1,4-N-acetyl-D-glucosaminyldiphosphoundecaprenol

Thus, the two substrates of this enzyme are UDP-glucose and N-acetyl-D-glucosaminyldiphosphoundecaprenol, whereas its two products are UDP and beta-D-glucosyl-1,4-N-acetyl-D-glucosaminyldiphosphoundecaprenol.

This enzyme belongs to the family of glycosyltransferases, specifically the hexosyltransferases.  The systematic name of this enzyme class is UDP-glucose:N-acetyl-D-glucosaminyldiphosphoundecaprenol 4-beta-D-glucosyltransferase. Other names in common use include UDP-D-glucose:N-acetylglucosaminyl pyrophosphorylundecaprenol, glucosyltransferase, uridine, diphosphoglucose-acetylglucosaminylpyrophosphorylundecaprenol, and glucosyltransferase.

References

 

EC 2.4.1
Enzymes of unknown structure